"Dust" is a song recorded by American country music group the Eli Young Band. It was released on February 3, 2014 as the second single from their fifth studio album, 10,000 Towns. The song was written by Jon Jones, James Young, Kyle Jacobs and Josh Osborne.

Critical reception
The song received a favorable review from Taste of Country, which said that "it rocks like they’ve never rocked on radio before." The reviewer described it as "fun, but not at the expense of poignancy" and "built to be a slow burn." Matt Bjorke of Roughstock gave the song four and a half stars out of five, writing that "the guitars and all-around sound are clearly Eli Young Band and less trend chasing, which is nice to see." He called it "a strongly-written song with an inviting, uplifting melody." Kevin John Coyne of Country Universe gave the song a B grade, calling it "professionally done and not too cluttered." He felt that there was "nothing identifiably country about it, but then again, nothing identifiably bad, either."

Music video
The music video was directed by Peter Zavadil and premiered in May 2014.

Chart performance
"Dust" debuted at number 53 on the U.S. Billboard Country Airplay chart for the week of February 15, 2014. It also debuted at number 42 on the U.S. Billboard Hot Country Songs chart for the week of February 22, 2014. The song has sold 323,000 copies in the U.S. as of September 2014.

Year-end charts

Certifications

References

2013 songs
2014 singles
Eli Young Band songs
Republic Nashville singles
Songs written by Kyle Jacobs (songwriter)
Songs written by Josh Osborne
Song recordings produced by Frank Liddell
Music videos directed by Peter Zavadil
Republic Records singles